Opsius is a genus of leafhoppers in the family Cicadellidae. There are about 19 described species in Opsius.

Species
These 19 species belong to the genus Opsius:

 Opsius confusus Korolevskaya, 1968
 Opsius croaticus Bednarczyk & Gêbicki, 1999
 Opsius cypriacus Lindberg, 1958
 Opsius dicessus (Horvath, 1911)
 Opsius discessus Horváth, 1911
 Opsius draensis Lindberg, 1963
 Opsius euxinus Dlabola, 1965
 Opsius ferganensis Dubovsky, 1966
 Opsius glaucovirens Stål, 1858
 Opsius gorgonum Lindberg, 1958
 Opsius heydeni Lethierry
 Opsius jucundus Lethierry, 1874
 Opsius lethierryi Wagner, 1942
 Opsius pallasi Letheirry, 1874
 Opsius richteri Dlabola, 1960
 Opsius scutellaris Lethierry, 1874
 Opsius smaragdinus Emeljanov, 1964
 Opsius stactogalus Fieber, 1866 (tamarix leafhopper)
 Opsius tigripes (Lethierry, 1876)

References

Cicadellidae genera
Articles created by Qbugbot
Opsiini